The New York Derby is the second leg of the "Big Apple Triple," a grouping created in 1999 consisting of three races at three different racetracks in New York state and restricted to three-year-olds bred in New York state. A horse who wins all three of the Big Apple Triple wins the purse total of $400,000 plus a $250,000 bonus. The first leg is the Mike Lee Stakes run at Belmont Park, and the third leg is the Albany Stakes at Saratoga Race Course.

The New York Derby is held at the Finger Lakes Racetrack in Farmington, New York and is restricted to three-year-olds of either gender bred in New York state. It is run at a mile and one/sixteenth on the dirt (8.5 furlongs) and currently offers a purse of $150,000.

This race was called the New York Breeders' Derby from 1969 to 1971, the New York Derby Handicap in 1974, and the New York Derby from 1977 to date.

Records
Time record: 
  miles - 1:42.85 : Strider's Ormsby (2005) (Finger Lakes track record at this distance)
  miles - 1:43.02 : Hit It Once More (2016) (New York Derby)

Most wins by a jockey
 3 - Kevin Whitley (1982, 1983, 1989)
 3 - John R. Davila Jr. (1996, 2003, 2015)
 3 - John A. Grabowski (2002, 2006, 2011)Most wins by a trainer: 4 - Ramon M. Hernandez (1977, 1979, 1981, 1998)Most wins by an owner:'''
 2 - Assunta Louis Farm (1979, 1981)
 2 - James F. Edwards (1984, 2000)
 2 - Sam F. Morrell (1989, 1996)
 2 - Barry K. Schwartz (1999, 2003)

Past winners

*2007- Berry Bound finished first by a head but was disqualified and placed second.

**1987 - Jazzing Around finished first by a head but was disqualification

References

Horse races in New York (state)
Racing series for horses
Flat horse races for three-year-olds
Finger Lakes Race Track
1969 establishments in New York (state)
Recurring sporting events established in 1969